The Eagles of the Central Hills, often referred to as Ukussa, was a state paramilitary in Sri Lanka. It was active in the 1987–1989 JVP insurgency. 

The Eagles of the Central Hills were made of police and army personnel who wanted more action against the JVP. They demanded anti-communist action in Sri Lanka to resist the insurgents.

Kandy Massacre

In Kundasale on 13 September 1989, the JVP allegedly killed sixteen family members of three security forces personnel.

The following night, the Eagles set fire to a number of residential dwellings in Menikhinna, killing approximately 52 people. The armed group then moved onto the villages of Kundasale and Aranagala, where they killed a further 30 people. Residents of Kandy found over 100 bodies floating in the river, and it was suspected that there were at least 50 additional deaths.

Peradeniya Massacre
On 5 October, armed vigilantes shot or beheaded fourteen workers at a Peradeniya University residential complex for custodial and clerical staff. Police later received a message from the vigilantes, who called themselves the Eagles of the Central Hills, claiming responsibility for the murders and that the victims were JVP supporters who had engineered the murder of T. E. Nagahawatte, an assistant registrar at the university and a captain in the local army volunteer reserve force.

References

Paramilitary organisations based in Sri Lanka
Guerrilla organizations 
Anti-communist organizations 
1987–1989 JVP insurrection 
1989 establishments in Sri Lanka

Military of Sri Lanka